Acacia pterocaulon is a shrub belonging to the genus Acacia and subgenus Alatae. It is native to a small area in the Mid West region of Western Australia.

Description
The intricate shrub has an erect or sprawling habit with many branches.
It has green glabrous branchlets. The phyllodes are continuous with the branchlets, splitting to form opposing wings along the branchlet with each one extending to the next underneath.
It blooms between October and January producing yellow flowers. Each racemose inflorescences has globular head of a  diameter containing 60 to 70 densely packed golden flowers.

Taxonomy
The species was first formally described by the botanist Bruce Maslin in 1995 as part of the work Acacia Miscellany 13. Taxonomy of some Western Australian phyllocladinous and aphyllodinous taxa (Leguminosae: Mimosoideae) as published in the journal Nuytsia. It was reclassified by Leslie Pedley in 2003 and Racosperma pterocaulon then transferred back to the current genus in 2006.

The type specimen was collected by Maslin in 1976 near Three Springs.

Acacia willdenowiana has phyllodes resembling those of A. pterocaulon. It is also similar to the closely related Acacia glaucoptera.

Distribution
The species is confined to a small area between Morawa and Three Springs where it is found on rocky hill slopes where growing in clay-loam or sandy-loam soils. It is often part of the understorey in Eucalyptus woodland communities or in dense Casuarina'' scrub.

See also
List of Acacia species

References

pterocaulon
Acacias of Western Australia
Plants described in 1995
Taxa named by Bruce Maslin